
Year 23 BC was either a common year starting on Saturday or Sunday or a leap year starting on Friday, Saturday or Sunday (link will display the full calendar) of the Julian calendar (the sources differ, see leap year error for further information) and a common year starting on Friday of the Proleptic Julian calendar. At the time, it was known as the Year of the Consulship of Augustus and Varro (or, less frequently, year 731 Ab urbe condita). The denomination 23 BC for this year has been used since the early medieval period, when the Anno Domini calendar era became the prevalent method in Europe for naming years.

Events 
 By place 

 Roman Empire 
 Caesar Augustus becomes Roman consul for the eleventh time. His co-consul is Aulus Terentius Varro Murena.
 Augustus relinquishes the position of consul, retains that of tribune of Rome, and assumes that of Princeps, or "First Citizen." (see Roman Empire).
 Augustus gets seriously ill: he gives Agrippa his signet ring and grants him the title imperium pro consule.
 Marcus Claudius Marcellus (nephew of Augustus) falls ill from a fever shortly after his uncle recovers and dies at the age of nineteen while serving as an aedile.
 The Nubians, led by queen Kandake Amanirenas, take the initiative against the Roman Empire, and attack the Roman province of Egypt moving towards Elephantine.
 In response to Meroë's incursions into Upper Egypt, the Roman legions move south and raze Napata. (History of Sudan).
 Herod the Great builds a palace in Jerusalem and the fortress Herodian in Judaea. He also marries his third wife, named Mariamne, the daughter of high priest Simon.
 Following coinage reform, the as is struck in reddish pure copper, instead of bronze. The denominations of sestertius and dupondius are introduced as large bronze coins.

 Osroene 
 Ma'nu III Saphul becomes ruler of Osroene.

 By topic 

 Architecture 
 The Roman writer, architect and engineer Marcus Vitruvius Pollio finishes writing De Architectura (known today as The Ten Books of Architecture), a treatise in Latin on architecture, and perhaps the first work about this discipline.

 Poetry 
 The Roman poet Horace publishes the first three books of Odes.

Births 
 Dong Xian, Chinese politician and general (d. 1 BC)
 Herod Archelaus, ethnarch of Samaria (Judea) (d. AD 18)

Deaths 
 Marcus Claudius Marcellus, son of Octavia and nephew of Augustus (b. 42 BC)

References